The California Golden Bears college football team represents the University of California, Berkeley in the North Division of the Pac-12 Conference (Pac-12). The Golden Bears compete as part of the National Collegiate Athletic Association (NCAA) Division I Football Bowl Subdivision. The program has had 34 head coaches since it began play during the 1886 season. As of 2017, Justin Wilcox is the head football coach of California Golden Bears.

Jeff Tedford (2002–12) is the leader in seasons coached (11), games won (82), and bowl appearances (8). Pappy Waldorf (1948–56) led the team to three Rose Bowl games from 1948 to 1950.  Andy Smith (1916–25) has the highest win percentage (.799) of any coach (minimum 3 seasons).

Key

Coaches

Notes

References

California

California Golden Bears football